The 42nd National Assembly of Quebec consists of those elected in the October 1, 2018, general election. As a result, François Legault (Coalition Avenir Québec) became Premier on October 18.

Member list

Cabinet ministers are in bold, party leaders are in italic and the president of the National Assembly is marked with a †.

Standings changes since the 42nd general election

Notes and references

Terms of the Quebec Legislature
2018 establishments in Quebec
2018 in Quebec
2019 in Quebec
2020 in Quebec
2021 in Quebec
2022 in Quebec
2018 in Canadian politics
2019 in Canadian politics
2020 in Canadian politics
2021 in Canadian politics
2022 in Canadian politics